Chuck Riley may refer to:
Chuck Riley (American football) (c. 1906–?), American football player and coach
Chuck Riley (politician) (born 1939), American politician in the state of Oregon
Chuck Riley (voice actor) (1940–2007), American voice-over artist
Chuck Riley (murderer) (born 1955), American murderer convicted in the 1975 "barbecue murders" case

See also
Charles Riley (disambiguation)